Virginia's 67th House of Delegates district elects one of 100 seats in the Virginia House of Delegates, the lower house of the state's bicameral legislature. District 67, located in Fairfax County and Loudoun County, has been represented by Democrat Karrie Delaney since January 2018.

List of delegates

References

External links
 

Virginia House of Delegates districts
Government in Loudoun County, Virginia
Government in Fairfax County, Virginia